Medusa is one of the three Gorgons in Greek mythology.

Medusa may also refer to:

Other mythological figures
Medusa, a daughter of Sthenelus (son of Andromeda and Perseus) and Nicippe
Medusa, a daughter of the Trojan king Priam
Medusa, a daughter of Pelias
Medusa, a daughter of Orsilochus
Medusa, one of the Hesperides

Art and entertainment

Fictional characters
Medusa, a Soul Eater character
Medusa, a Kamen Rider Wizard character
Medusa, a military unit in the Jason Bourne novel series
Medusa, a planet in the TV series Star Maidens
Madame Medusa, a character in The Rescuers
Medusae, an alien race in the novel The Legion of Space
Medusa, an antagonist in the Japanese manga Rosario + Vampire
Rider, a Fate/stay night character
Medusa (comics), a fictional character, a superhero appearing in American comic books published by Marvel Comics
Medusa (DC Comics), a fictional character appearing in DC Comics publications
 Medusa, a character in the Kid Icarus game series
 Medusa, a monster in the Eggerland game series

Film and TV
 Medusa, a 1973 film starring George Hamilton and Cameron Mitchell
 Medusa, a film production company owned by Fininvest
 Medusa: Dare to Be Truthful, a mockumentary film
 "Medusa" (Supergirl), a season 2 episode of the TV series
 "Medusa" (The X-Files), twelfth episode of season 8 of the TV series

Literature
Medusa, a 1988 novel by Hammond Innes
Medusa, a 2004 novel by Thomas Thiemeyer
Medusa (Cussler novel), a 2009 novel by Clive Cussler and Paul Kemprecos
Medusa (Dibdin novel), a 2003 novel by Michael Dibdin
Medusa, and Other Poems, by Lady Charlotte Elliot (1878)
"Medusa", a poem by Louise Bogan
Medusa: A Tiger by the Tail, a 1983 novel by Jack L. Chalker

Music
 Medusa, a female rap artist affiliated with open-mic workshop Project Blowed
 Medusa (band), punk-influenced rock band from the UK
 Medusa (Annie Lennox album), 1995
 Medusa (Clan of Xymox album), 1986
 Medusa (Paradise Lost album), 2017
 Medusa (Trapeze album), 1970
 The Medusa, an album by New Zealand rock band Tadpole, 2002
 "Medusa", a song by Anthrax from Spreading the Disease, 1985
 "Medusa", a song by Jhayco, Anuel AA and J Balvin, 2020
 "Medusa", a song by Jolin Tsai from Play, 2014
 "Medusa", a song by Sweet from Desolation Boulevard, 1974
 "The Medusa", a song by The Haunted from The Dead Eye, 2006

Paintings
 Medusa (Caravaggio)
 Medusa (Leonardo)

Places
 Medousa, Xanthi, Greece
 Medusa, New York, United States
 Medusa Lake, another name for Lake Natron, Tanzania
 Medusa Lake (Antarctica)

Astronomy
 Medusa Nebula
 Medusa Galaxy Merger (NGC 4194), pair of interacting galaxies in the constellation Ursa Major
 149 Medusa, an asteroid

Ships
 French frigate Méduse (1810), which inspired several works of art:
The Raft of the Medusa, 1818–1819 painting by Théodore Géricault
Das Floß der Medusa, 1968 oratorio by Hans Werner Henze
Le Radeau de la Méduse, 1994 French film
Italian submarine Medusa, several
 HMS Medusa, one of ten ships of the Royal Navy
 SMS Medusa, a Gazelle-class light cruiser built by the Imperial German Navy
 USS Medusa (1869), a Passaic-class coastal monitor
 USS Medusa (AR-1), a fleet repair ship launched in 1923
  MEDUSA, a proposed type of nuclear pulse propulsion for interplanetary and interstellar space travel

Roller coasters
 Medusa (Six Flags Discovery Kingdom), a steel floorless roller coaster
 Medusa (Six Flags Great Adventure), steel floorless roller coaster
 Medusa Steel Coaster, a hybrid roller coaster in Six Flags México

Other uses
 Medusa pepper, a Capsicum annuum cultivar
 MEDUSA, a design software program
 MEDUSA (weapon)
 Operation Medusa, a military operation in Afghanistan
 Medusa piercing
 Medusa (biology) (jellyfish)

See also
 Madusa, stage name of professional wrestler Debrah Miceli (born 1964)
 Méduse (disambiguation)
 Meduza (disambiguation)
 The Medusa Frequency, a 1987 novel by Russell Hoban